Woodmoor is an unincorporated community and a census-designated place (CDP) located in and governed by El Paso County, Colorado, United States. The CDP is a part of the Colorado Springs, CO Metropolitan Statistical Area. The population of the Woodmoor CDP was 8,741 at the United States Census 2010. The Monument post office (Zip Code 80132) serves the area.

Geography
The approximate center of Woodmoor is 1.5 miles due east of the center of Monument, Colorado.

Common Areas
The Woodmoor Commons have been somewhat of a mystery since there were no signs designating those areas for common use and no maps available to all Woodmoor Residents which designate the location of the common areas. In 1994, the Woodmoor Improvement Association rounded up volunteer residents to hike the areas, name them, build and install signs to the bigger areas, and prepare the first Guide to the Woodmoor Commons.
Additionally, Woodmoor has numerous bridle trails in both North and South Woodmoor.

Demographics

See also

Outline of Colorado
Index of Colorado-related articles
State of Colorado
Colorado cities and towns
Colorado census designated places
Colorado counties
El Paso County, Colorado
List of statistical areas in Colorado
Front Range Urban Corridor
South Central Colorado Urban Area
Colorado Springs, CO Metropolitan Statistical Area

References

External links

Woodmoor Improvement Association
Woodmoor Water and Sanitation District No. 1
The Country Club at Woodmoor
El Paso County website

Census-designated places in El Paso County, Colorado
Census-designated places in Colorado